IRIS Shamshir is a  in the Southern Fleet of the Islamic Republic of Iran Navy.

Construction and commissioning 
Shamshir was built by French Constructions Mécaniques de Normandie at Cherbourg, as one of the second six contracted on 14 October 1974. Her keel was laid down on 15 May 1976 and on 12 September 1977, she was launched.

Service history 
During Iran-Iraq War, her home port was Bushehr Naval Base.

Her refit was completed in  2014 and Iranian chief of naval operations was quoted as saying, "Shamshir missile-launcher warship is capable of firing different mid-range and long-range surface-to-surface missiles, including Nour and Qader, or any other type of missile after its recent overhaul... The warship also has a double-purpose surface-to-surface and surface-to-air artillery which has been built by Iranian industries and the defense ministry and was tested successfully in the drills". He also added that she is equipped with domestically built radars and new weapons systems, including 76mm caliber cannons.

Starting on 9 April 2014, Shamshir departed home for a six-day search and rescue joint drill with Pakistan Navy and Royal Navy of Oman vessels.

See also 

 List of current ships of the Islamic Republic of Iran Navy
 List of military equipment manufactured in Iran

References 

Missile boats of the Islamic Republic of Iran Navy
Ships built at Shahid Tamjidi shipyard
Ships of the Islamic Republic of Iran Navy
Ships built in Iran
Missile boats of Iran
1977 ships
Ships built in France
Iran–Iraq War naval ships of Iran